Ivana Rudelić (born 25 January 1992) is a German-born Croatian footballer who plays as a striker for Bayern Munich of the Frauen-Bundesliga, as well as the Croatia women's national football team.

A former German youth international, Rudelić won the 2008 U-17 and 2011 U-19 European Championships, as well as a bronze medal in the 2008 U-17 World Cup.

International career

References

External links
 
 

1992 births
Living people
German women's footballers
Croatian women's footballers
Croatia women's international footballers
German people of Croatian descent
Women's association football forwards
Frauen-Bundesliga players
FC Bayern Munich (women) players
FF USV Jena players
Bayer 04 Leverkusen (women) players
Sportspeople from Tübingen (region)
People from Wangen im Allgäu
Footballers from Baden-Württemberg
Germany women's youth international footballers